Senayan is an administrative village (kelurahan in Indonesian) at  Kebayoran Baru subdistrict, South Jakarta, Indonesia. The post code is 12190.

Boundaries
The borders of Senayan are: 
 Semanggi Flyover in the north
 General Sudirman Street in Gelora administrative village, Tanah Abang subdistrict, Central Jakarta in the west
 General Gatot Subroto Street in Karet Semanggi administrative village, Setiabudi subdistrict in the east
 Selong administrative village in the south.

It is worth to note that in spite of the name use, the Gelora Bung Karno sport complex - which is also known as Gelora Senayan Sports Complex, is not within the boundaries of this administrative village, not even in South Jakarta. The sports complex lies within the up-north adjacent Gelora administrative village, which is under the administrative municipality of Central Jakarta.

Highlights

Among the important national as well as regional landmarks located in this area are:
 Headquarters of Greater Jakarta Regional Metropolitan Police
 The office of Indonesian Investment Coordinating Board
 Plaza Mandiri, the headquarters office of Bank Mandiri - largest bank in Indonesia in terms of assets, loans and deposits
 Headquarters office of the Directorate General of Taxation - the tax office of Indonesia
 The SCBD - one of Jakarta's prominent business and commercial centers
 The Indonesia Stock Exchange (BEI) building is located in this area within the SCBD.
 The Widya Chandra residential complex, in which many Indonesian government ministers are having their official residences, is also located in this area.
 TVRI Nasional

Toponym
The name Senayan is derived from the word Wangsanayan, "land of Wangsanayan". According to De Haan, Wangsanayan was a lieutenant from Bali who lived at the end of the 17th century, but little is known about him. As time progressed, Wangsanayan was shortened to Senayan.

See also
Plaza Senayan, a shopping mall
Senayan City, a mixed-use development
Senayan MRT station

References

Administrative villages in Jakarta